"Can't Smile Without You" is a song written by Christian Arnold, David Martin and Geoff Morrow, and recorded by various artists including Barry Manilow and the Carpenters. It was first recorded and released by David Martin as a solo single in 1975. The version recorded by Manilow in 1977 and released in 1978 is the most well-known.

Barry Manilow version
"Can't Smile Without You" was recorded by Manilow in 1977 and released on his 1978 album, Even Now. Manilow also issued the song as a single in 1978 where it reached No. 1 on the Billboard Adult Contemporary chart and No. 3 on the Billboard Hot 100 chart.

Manilow's version has slightly different lyrics from the Carpenters' version such as the Carpenters's line "I can't laugh and I can't walk/I'm finding it hard even to talk" which was changed in Manilow's version to "I can't laugh and I can't sing/I'm finding it hard to do anything". The Carpenters remixed the song with additional orchestration for the B-side of the 1977 "Calling Occupants of Interplanetary Craft" single, revising the lyrics to read "I can't laugh and I can't sleep/I don't even talk to people I meet".

Billboard said that Manilow's version starts "sweetly with a soft whistle" and builds in intensity over the course of the song, similar to other of Manilow's popular songs.  Record World said that it "moves at a moderate, catchy tempo with a lost-love lyric of the sort that has swelled the artist's audience."

A version on Manilow's greatest hits box set, The Complete Collection and Then Some..., contains a slightly different version to the previously released version.

During live performances, Barry Manilow will pull a girl out of the audience to sing the song as a duet with him.

Chart performance

Weekly singles charts

Year-end charts

Carpenters version
The song was recorded in 1976 by the Carpenters and released on their May 1976 album, A Kind of Hush. It was also the B-side track for their 1977 single, "Calling Occupants of Interplanetary Craft", released in support of their 1977 album, Passage.

Other versions
Gino Cunico recorded it in the summer of 1975 and released the song in 1976 on his album, Gino Cunico.
Engelbert Humperdinck also recorded and released the song in 1976 on his album, After the Lovin'. The lyrics are identical to the Carpenters' version.
Menswear recorded a cover for the 1996 Childline charity album.
In 2010, GP Maxine Brooks released the song as a charity single for Nurse's Aid, supporting wounded soldiers and in memory of a WWI heroine.
In 2020, Sleeping At Last recorded and released a version on his album, “Covers Vol. 3”

George Michael lawsuit
On behalf of the songwriters, publishing company Dick James Music sued George Michael for plagiarism in the mid-1980s claiming that the 1984 Wham! single, "Last Christmas", lifted its melody from "Can't Smile Without You". The case was settled out of court.

See also
List of number-one adult contemporary singles of 1978 (U.S.)

References

1975 songs
1975 singles
1978 singles
The Carpenters songs
Barry Manilow songs
A&M Records singles
Arista Records singles
Songs written by Geoff Morrow
Torch songs
1970s ballads
Pop ballads
Songs about loneliness